The Mobile Metropolitan Area comprises Mobile and Washington counties in the southwest corner of Alabama in the United States. As of the 2020 census the metropolitan area had a population of 430,197. The Mobile metropolitan area is the third-largest metropolitan area in the state of Alabama, after Birmingham and Huntsville.

The Mobile Metropolitan Area and Daphne-Fairhope-Foley Metropolitan Area, which comprises all of Baldwin County, together make up the Mobile-Daphne-Fairhope Combined Statistical Area, with a population in 2020 of 661,964.

Counties
 Mobile-Daphne-Fairhope combined statistical area
 Mobile metropolitan area
 Mobile County
 Washington County
 Daphne–Fairhope–Foley metropolitan area
 Baldwin County

Mobile Metropolitan Area

Mobile County communities

Places with more than 150,000 inhabitants
 Mobile (principal city)

Places with 10,000 to 35,000 inhabitants
 Prichard
 Saraland
 Tillmans Corner (unincorporated)

Places with 1,000 to 10,000 inhabitants

 Bayou La Batre
 Chickasaw
 Citronelle
 Creola
 Dauphin Island
 Grand Bay
 Satsuma
 Semmes
 Theodore
 Mount Vernon

Unincorporated places

 Alabama Port
 Axis
 Bucks
 Calvert
 Chunchula
 Coden
 Eight Mile
 Fernland
 Heron Bay
 Irvington
 Kushla
 Le Moyne
 Mauvilla
 Mon Louis
 St. Elmo
 Whistler

Washington County communities

Places with more than 1,000 inhabitants
 Chatom

Other communities

 Calvert
 Deer Park
 Fairford
 Fruitdale
 Hobson
 Leroy
 Malcolm
 McIntosh
 Millry
 St. Stephens
 Sims Chapel
 Tibbie
 Vinegar Bend

Daphne-Fairhope-Foley Metropolitan Area

Baldwin County communities

Places with more than 25,000 inhabitants
 Daphne

Places with 10,000 to 25,000 inhabitants
 Fairhope
 Foley
 Gulf Shores
 Spanish Fort

Places with 1,000 to 10,000 inhabitants

 Bay Minette
 Orange Beach
 Robertsdale
 Loxley
 Elberta
 Point Clear
 Summerdale

Other communities

 Bon Secour
 Lillian
 Magnolia Springs
 Perdido
 Perdido Beach
 Silverhill
 Stapleton
 Stockton

Transportation
  Interstate 10 (Which connects with Los Angeles and Jacksonville)
  Interstate 65 (Which connects to Chicago)
  Interstate 165
  U.S. Highway 31
  U.S. Highway 43
  U.S. Highway 45
  U.S. Highway 90
  U.S. Highway 98

References